Clermont  may refer to:

Places

Australia
 Clermont, Queensland, a town in the Isaac Region

Belgium
 Clermont-sur-Berwinne, a town in Wallonia

Canada
 Clermont, Prince Edward Island
 Clermont, Abitibi-Témiscamingue, Quebec
 Clermont, Capitale-Nationale, Quebec

France
 Clermont, Ariège, in the Ariège département
 Clermont, Haute-Savoie, in the Haute-Savoie département
 Clermont, Landes, in the Landes département
 Clermont, Oise, sous-préfecture of the Oise département
 Arrondissement of Clermont, in the Oise département
 Clermont-Ferrand, in the Puy-de-Dôme département

Greece
 Chlemoutsi, Greece, originally named Clermont

Ireland 
 Clermont Carn, a mountain in County Louth, Ireland

South Africa
 Clermont, KwaZulu-Natal, a township in Durban, South Africa

United States
 Clermont, Florida, a city
 Clermont, Georgia, a town
 Clermont, Indiana, a town
 Clermont, Iowa, a city
 Clermont, Kentucky, a USGS-designated populated place
 Clermont, Burlington County, New Jersey, an unincorporated community
 Clermont, Cape May County, New Jersey, an unincorporated community
 Clermont, New York, a town
 Clermont State Historic Site, New York, location of Clermont Manor, home of Robert Livingston (1688–1775)
 Clermont County, Ohio
 Clermont (Alexandria, Virginia), a plantation
 Clermont (Berryville, Virginia), a farm

People
 Clermont (surname), a list of people with the surname Clermont or de Clermont
 Clermont (mathematician), 16th century French mathematician and military engineer
 Clermont Huger Lee (1914–2006), American landscape architect
 House of Clermont, a French noble family dating back to the 10th century
 Any holders of the title Viscount Clermont and Baron Clermont in Ireland

Other uses
 Roman Catholic Archdiocese of Clermont (i.e. Clermont-Ferrand), established in the first century A.D.
 Council of Clermont, a council of the Roman Catholic Church (1095 AD) that is said to have led to the Crusades
 Clermont, a 1798 Gothic novel by Regina Maria Roche
 Clermont Club, a private gambling club in London, England
 Clermont, colloquial name of the North River Steamboat Robert Fulton's first steamboat
 Clermont Foot, also known as simply Clermont, a French football club based in Clermont-Ferrand
 Clermont UC, a French multisports club from Clermont-Ferrand
 Clermont Group, a Singapore-based conglomerate
 University of Cincinnati Clermont College or UC Clermont, a regional campus of the University of Cincinnati
 Collège de Clermont, original name of what is now the Lycée Louis-le-Grand, a secondary school in Paris
 Clermont (1786 ship), an American merchant ship

See also
 Clermont Academy, a historic school building in Clermont, New York, on the National Register of Historic Places
 Places in France:
 Clermont-Créans, in the Sarthe département
 Clermont-de-Beauregard, in the Dordogne département
 Clermont-Dessous, in the Lot-et-Garonne département
 Clermont-d'Excideuil, in the Dordogne département
 Clermont-en-Argonne, in the Meuse département
 Clermont-Ferrand, préfecture of the Puy-de-Dôme département,  in the Auvergne région
 Clermont-le-Fort, in the Haute-Garonne département
 Clermont-les-Fermes, in the Aisne département
 Clermont-l'Hérault, in the Hérault département
 Clermont-Pouyguillès, in the Gers département
 Clermont-Savès, in the Gers département
 Clermont-Soubiran, in the Lot-et-Garonne département
 Clermont-sur-Lauquet, in the Aude département
 Château de Clermont
 Château de Clermont (Isère), a ruined castle
 Château de Clermont (Lot), a castle
 ASM Clermont Auvergne, a French rugby union club located in Clermont-Ferrand
 Claremont (disambiguation)
 Clairemont (disambiguation)
 Clairmont (disambiguation)
 Montclair (disambiguation)
 Mont Clare (disambiguation)